Három körösztény leány is a Hungarian play, written in the 1520s. It is believed to have been authored by Lea Ráskay.

Hungarian plays
1520s plays